The 2004 Churchill Cup was held between 14 June and 21 June 2004 in Calgary and Edmonton, Canada. It was the second edition of the Churchill Cup competition. The three original rugby union teams taking part in the men's competition: Canada, England A and the USA, were joined by the New Zealand Maori.

A women's competition, involving the same teams, took place alongside the men's event.

Format

The competition took on a straight 'knock-out' format. Four teams played in two semi-final matches, with the North American sides kept apart. The winners of each semi final competed in the final match, while the losers took part in a 3rd/4th place playoff. Four matches were played over a period of two weeks.

Results

Semi-finals

Final

 after extra time

Consolation final

See also
 Churchill Cup

References

External links
 Churchill Cup official site

2004
2004 rugby union tournaments for national teams
International rugby union competitions hosted by Canada
2003–04 in English rugby union
2004 in Canadian rugby union
2004 in American rugby union
2004 in New Zealand rugby union